Biel is a municipality (pop. 186) in the Spanish province of Zaragoza, in the autonomous community of Aragon.  Biel included the village or "Lower Local Entity" ("Entidad Local Menor") of Fuencalderas.

References 

Municipalities in the Province of Zaragoza